The 1929 All-Ireland Senior Football Championship Final was the 42nd All-Ireland Final and the deciding match of the 1929 All-Ireland Senior Football Championship, an inter-county Gaelic football tournament for the top teams in Ireland. 

Kerry won the final by three points with a goal by Ned Sweeney.

It was the third of three All-Ireland football titles won by Kerry in the 1920s, which made them joint "team of the decade" with Dublin who also won three.

References

All-Ireland Senior Football Championship Final
All-Ireland Senior Football Championship Final, 1929
All-Ireland Senior Football Championship Finals
Kerry county football team matches
Kildare county football team matches